Rhynchotrochus is a genus of air-breathing land snails, terrestrial pulmonate gastropod mollusks in the subfamily Hadrinae of the family Camaenidae.

Species
 Rhynchotrochus albocarinatus (E. A. Smith, 1887)
 Rhynchotrochus gorenduensis (Brazier, 1886)
 Rhynchotrochus grata (Michelin, 1831)
 Rhynchotrochus gurgustii (Cox, 1879)
 Rhynchotrochus jucundus (Fulton, 1902)
 Rhynchotrochus kubaryi (Möllendorff, 1895)
 Rhynchotrochus louisiadensis (Forbes, 1852)
 Rhynchotrochus macgillivrayi (Forbes, 1852)
 Rhynchotrochus meekianus (E. A. Smith, 1905)
 Rhynchotrochus misima (Iredale, 1941)
 Rhynchotrochus naso (Martens, 1883)
 Rhynchotrochus rhombostomus (L. Pfeiffer, 1845)
 Rhynchotrochus rhynchotus (Boettger, 1918)
 Rhynchotrochus rollsianus (E. A. Smith, 1887)
 Rhynchotrochus siglerae Thach, 2018
 Rhynchotrochus strabo (Brazier, 1876)
 Rhynchotrochus taylorianus (A. Adams & Reeve, 1850)
 Rhynchotrochus wiegmanni (Martens, 1894)
 Rhynchotrochus williamsi (Clench & Archer, 1936)
 Rhynchotrochus woodlarkianus (Souverbie, 1863)
 Rhynchotrochus yulensis (Brazier, 1876)

References

External links

 Möllendorff, O. F. von. (1895). On a collection of land shells made by Mr I. Kubary in German New Guinea. Proceedings of the Malacological Society of London. 1: 234-240, pl. 15.
 Iredale, T. (1941). A basic list of the land Mollusca of Papua. The Australian Zoologist. 10(1): 51-94, pls. 3-4
 Clench, W. J.; Turner, R. D. (1966). Monograph of the genus Rhynchotrochus (Papuininae: Camaenidae). Journal of the Malacological Society of Australia. 1(9): 59-95

Camaenidae